Yosihiko H. Sinoto (September 3, 1924 – October 4, 2017) was a Japanese-born American anthropologist at the Bishop Museum in Honolulu, Hawaii. He is known for his anthropological expeditions throughout the Pacific, particularly Hawaii and French Polynesia.

Biography
Sinoto was born in Tokyo in 1924. After World War II ended, he went to study at the University of California, but was recruited to be anthropologist Kenneth Emory's research assistant before he got there. In 1954 he moved to Hawaii, where he began his archaeological work at South Point on Hawaii. In 1960 he went to Tahiti, in French Polynesia.

He graduated as BA at the University of Hawaii in 1958 and he acquired his DSc at the University of Hokkaido in Japan in 1962.

In 1964-5 he excavated Hane in the Marquesas Islands, where he discovered more than 12,000 bird bones. Nearly 10,000 of them are reported to belong to about seven species of shearwaters and petrels.

On the island of Huahine, where he worked for 40 years, he helped to restore and preserve the prehistoric village of Maeva with its temple ruins, or marae. In 1977 he discovered the remnants of a deep-sea voyaging canoe. Sinoto's further expeditions led him to the Society Islands, Marquesas, Tuamotus and others, where he studied the settlements, artifacts, migration patterns and Polynesian cultural ties.

Though he officially retired in 2013, Sinoto continued to work until his death on October 4, 2017.

Yosihiko Sinoto's wife, Kazuko Sinoto, who died in 2013, was a historian of Japanese immigration. His son, Akihiko, was an archaeologist at the Bishop Museum.

Honors

Sinoto is honored as a Tahitian chevalier (knight) of the Order of Tahiti Nui in 2000 and the Japanese Order of the Rising Sun, Gold and Silver Rays. He also was awarded the Society of Hawaiian Archaeology’s Naki‘ikeaho Cultural Stewardship Award, the Bishop Museum’s Robert J. Pfeiffer Medal, and the Historic Hawaii Foundation's lifetime achievement award. He was also named a Living Treasure of Hawaii.

Sinoto's lorikeet (Vini sinotoi), an extinct lorikeet species in the Marquesas Islands, and Sir Yosihiko Sinoto, a hybrid variety of hibiscus, are both named for him.

Bibliography

Further reading

References

Robert D. Craig, Russell T. Clement: Who's who in Oceania, 1980-1981. Institute for Polynesian Studies, Brigham Young University—Hawaii Campus, 1980 

1924 births
2017 deaths
Japanese anthropologists
Huahine
People from Tokyo
Japanese emigrants to the United States
Recipients of the Order of the Rising Sun, 5th class
University of Hawaiʻi alumni
Hokkaido University alumni
University of California alumni
Japanese archaeologists
20th-century American anthropologists
20th-century American archaeologists
21st-century American anthropologists
21st-century American archaeologists
Recipients of the Order of Tahiti Nui